Benson Lake is a lake in Yosemite National Park, United States.

Benson Lake was named for Harry Coupland Benson, a Yosemite National Park official. Benson Lake has a surface elevation of 2310m. It is located just 700m down a spur trail from the Pacific Crest Trail and has a broad, sandy beach. The Pacific Crest Trail reaches its lowest point between Sonora Pass, 67km to the north, and Devil's Postpile National Monument 100km to the south, at the junction with this spur trail.

See also
List of lakes in California

References

Lakes of Tuolumne County, California
Lakes of Yosemite National Park